William Peter Moseley (born 27 April 1987) is an English actor. He is known for playing Peter Pevensie in the film series The Chronicles of Narnia (2005–2010), which won him a Kids' Choice Award, in addition to nominations for a Saturn Award and a Young Artist Award. He also played Prince Liam in the E! series The Royals (2015–2018).

Early life
Moseley was born in the Cotswolds village of Sheepscombe, Gloucestershire, England. William has two younger siblings (a brother and a sister). Daisy Elizabeth Moseley was born in 1989 and Benjamin Hugh Moseley was born in 1992. He is the son of Juliette E. (née Fleming) and Peter A. Moseley, a cinematographer. Moseley attended Sheepscombe Primary School from September 1991 to July 1998, and then continued his education at Wycliffe College, also taking time off at Downfield Sixth Form, Stroud.

Career
Moseley began his career as an extra on the television film Cider with Rosie in 1998, when he was 11 years old. Several years later, casting director Pippa Hall who'd worked with him on Cider With Rosie recommended him for the role of Peter Pevensie in the fantasy film The Chronicles of Narnia: The Lion, the Witch and the Wardrobe; eighteen months later, Moseley officially won the role and was cast. A blockbuster feature, the film was well received by both critics and audiences. For his performance, Moseley earned nominations for the Saturn Award for Best Actor and the Young Artist Award for Best Performance in a Feature Film (Comedy or Drama) – Leading Young Actor. Moseley reprised the role of Peter in the 2008 sequel, The Chronicles of Narnia: Prince Caspian, which earned positive reviews from critics, though it was not as commercially successful as its predecessor. For Prince Caspian, Moseley won Favorite Male Film Star from the Nickelodeon Kids' Choice Awards. He also earned a second Young Artist Award nomination, in the category of Best Cast. Moseley reprised the role of Peter a third time with a cameo in 2010's The Chronicles of Narnia: The Voyage of the Dawn Treader, despite the character's absence from the book of the same name. The Voyage of the Dawn Treader did not meet the same critical success as The Chronicles of Narnia's first two installments, although it did financially well in comparison to Prince Caspian.

In 2013, Moseley starred as Daniel Lombardi in the action thriller film Run alongside Kelsey Chow. In 2014, Moseley played Anderl Gruber in the adventure drama The Silent Mountain, which follows a young Austrian soldier in World War I who fights his way through the Alps to rescue his first love and escape the impending explosion that will rock the mountain.

In 2015, he played the role of Jared in the movie Margarita with a Straw. Later that year, he was cast as Prince Liam in the E! original series The Royals alongside Elizabeth Hurley and Alexandra Park. Describing the role, Moseley stated that "it's like (if) Prince Harry was thrown into being the next King of England. He basically is sort of a rebel ... doesn't really care what anybody thinks, does whatever he wants to do, when he wants to do it." The Royals earned mixed reviews, although Moseley and the ensemble's acting were acclaimed. In 2016, Moseley starred as Tyler in the horror thriller film Friend Request, directed by Simon Verhoeven. He then starred as Arden Lowe in the Lifetime movie My Sweet Audrina based on a novel by V.C. Andrews. He has joined the Stand Up to Cancer programme "Change the Odds", which features many other young actors. Moseley recently portrayed Aysel in the Brent Ryan Green film The Veil.

In 2018, Moseley appeared in the Australian biographical adventure film, In Like Flynn, alongside actors Corey William Large and Clive Standen. He also starred as Cam Harrison in the fantasy drama film The Little Mermaid alongside Poppy Drayton. In 2021, Moseley starred as the main character in the music video for The Living Tombstone's "Long Time Friends". That same year, Moseley starred alongside Johanna Braddy in the independent film Saving Paradise, where he played the role of Michael Peterson, a Wall Street investment banker, directed by Jay Silverman and written by Van Billet.

Personal life
Moseley dated actress Kelsey Chow from 2012 to 2018, his co-star in the film Run. While filming 2014's The Silent Mountain, Moseley was badly injured when struck by lightning while on set. As a result, he has a scar on his biceps.

Filmography

Film

Television

Video games

Music videos

Awards and nominations

References

External links

 

Living people
English male child actors
English male film actors
Male actors from Gloucestershire
People educated at Wycliffe College, Gloucestershire
20th-century English male actors
21st-century English male actors
1987 births
American Ninja Warrior contestants